Velivayal  is a village in the  
Avadaiyarkoilrevenue block of Pudukkottai district, Tamil Nadu, India.

Demographics 

As per the 2001 census, Velivayal had a total population of 831 with 406 males and 425 females. Out of the total population 485 people were literate.

References

Villages in Pudukkottai district